From List of National Natural Landmarks, these are the National Natural Landmarks in Indiana.

Notes and references

Indiana
National Natural Landmarks